The 2017–18 season was Udinese Calcio's 38th season in Serie A and their 23rd consecutive season in the top-flight. The club competed in Serie A and the Coppa Italia.

Following a 4–0–8 start to the season, coach Luigi Delneri was replaced by 2006 FIFA World Cup winner and former Lazio and Milan player Massimo Oddo. Following an upturn in form which saw the club win all five league games in December, Udinese's season dipped severely, with a club record run of eleven consecutive Serie A defeats, from 11 February to 22 April 2018. As a result, Oddo was sacked and replaced by former Juventus player Igor Tudor on 24 April. The club finished the season in 14th place; they were eliminated in the Coppa Italia in the round of 16 by Napoli.

Kevin Lasagna finished the season as the club's top scorer, with 12 goals in Serie A and two in the Coppa Italia.

Players

Squad information
Last updated on 20 May 2018
Appearances include league matches only

Transfers

In

Loans in

Out

Loans out

Pre-season and friendlies

Competitions

Serie A

League table

Results summary

Results by round

Matches

Coppa Italia

Statistics

Appearances and goals

|-
! colspan=14 style=background:#dcdcdc; text-align:center| Goalkeepers

|-
! colspan=14 style=background:#dcdcdc; text-align:center| Defenders

|-
! colspan=14 style=background:#dcdcdc; text-align:center| Midfielders

|-
! colspan=14 style=background:#dcdcdc; text-align:center| Forwards

|-
! colspan=14 style=background:#dcdcdc; text-align:center| Players transferred out during the season

Goalscorers

Last updated: 20 May 2018

Clean sheets

Last updated: 20 May 2018

Disciplinary record

Last updated: 29 April 2018

References

Udinese Calcio seasons
Udinese